The 1998 Westminster Council election took place on 7 May 1998 to elect members of Westminster City Council in London, England. The whole council was up for election and the Conservative party stayed in overall control of the council.

Background

Election result

Ward results

References

1998 London Borough council elections